Aberdeen F.C. competed in the Scottish Premier Division, Scottish Cup, League Cup and European Champions' Cup in season 1984–85.

Overview

Aberdeen won their fourth Scottish League championship and reached the semi-finals of the Scottish Cup, but were knocked out in the first round of the Scottish League Cup and the European Cup. New signing Frank McDougall scored 24 goals in his debut season at Pittodrie as Aberdeen won the Premier Division with a record points total of 59 from a possible 72.

Results

Scottish Premier Division

Final standings

Scottish League Cup

Scottish Cup

European Champions' Cup

Squad

Appearances & Goals

|}

References

Aberdeen F.C. seasons
Aberdeen
Scottish football championship-winning seasons